Obesotoma simplex is a species of sea snail, a marine gastropod mollusk in the family Mangeliidae.

Description
The length of the shell varies between 7 mm and 20 mm.

The shell is whitish or flesh-white, under a livid olivaceous epidermis. It is smooth, or with fine spiral striae. The aperture is violaceous to white.

Distribution
This species occurs in European waters and in the Northwest Atlantic Ocean off Svalbard and in the Barents Sea; also in the Bering Strait and in the Sea of Okhotsk

References

 Middendorff, A.T. (1849) Beitrage zu einer Malacozoologia Rossica. II. Aufzahlung und Beschretbung der zur Meeresfauna Russlands gehorigen Einschaler. Memoires de l'Academie Imperiale des Sciences de Saint-Petersbourg, Serie 6. Sciences Mathematique, Physique et Naturelles, 8 (5–6) : 329–516 (In reprint pp. 1–187)
 Sars, 1878. Bidrag til Kundskaben om Norges Artktische Fauna. I. Mollusca Regionis Articae Norvegiae
 Bogdanov I.P. 1990. Molluscs of the subfamily Oenopotinae (Gastropoda, Pectinibranchia, Turridae) of the seas of the USSR. Fauna SSSR, Molluski, 5(3): 1–223 [In Russian]. (Description of shell and radula; distributional map).
 Brunel, P., L. Bosse, and G. Lamarche. 1998. Catalogue of the marine invertebrates of the estuary and Gulf of St. Lawrence. Canadian Special Publication of Fisheries and Aquatic Sciences, 126. 405 p
 Gofas, S.; Le Renard, J.; Bouchet, P. (2001). Mollusca, in: Costello, M.J. et al. (Ed.) (2001). European register of marine species: a check-list of the marine species in Europe and a bibliography of guides to their identification. Collection Patrimoines Naturels, 50: pp. 180–213

External links
 
  Tucker, J.K. 2004 Catalog of recent and fossil turrids (Mollusca: Gastropoda). Zootaxa 682:1–1295.

simplex
Gastropods described in 1849